Colostygia is a genus of moths in the family Geometridae erected by Jacob Hübner in 1825.

Selected species
 Colostygia ablutaria (Boisduval, 1840)
 Colostygia aestivalis (Dioszeghy, 1930)
 Colostygia albidissima (Strand, 1920) 
 Colostygia albigirata (Kollar, 1844) (from India)
 Colostygia albocincta (Lempke, 1950) 
 Colostygia alboviridata (Haworth, 1802) 
 Colostygia algidata (Möschler, 1874) 
 Colostygia alpestrata (Hübner, 1800-1808)
 Colostygia approximata (Lempke, 1950)
 Colostygia aptata (Hübner, 1813)
 Colostygia aquearia (Bruand, 1846)
 Colostygia aqueata (Hübner, 1813)
 Colostygia arctica (Schryer, 1881)
 Colostygia atra (Rebel, 1910)
 Colostygia austriacaria (Herrich-Schäffer, 1852)
 Colostygia corydalaria (Graeser, 1889)
 Colostygia cyrnea (Wehrli, 1925)
 Colostygia fitzi (Schawerda, 1914)
 Colostygia hilariata (Pinker, 1954)
 Colostygia kitschelti (Rebel, 1934)
 Colostygia kollariaria (Herrich-Schäffer, 1848)
 Colostygia laetaria (La Harpe, 1853)
 Colostygia multistrigaria (Haworth, 1809) – mottled gray
 Colostygia olivata (Denis & Schiffermüller, 1775) – beech-green carpet
 Colostygia pectinataria (Knoch, 1781) – green carpet
 Colostygia pragmatica Viidalepp, 1988
 Colostygia puengeleri (Stertz, 1902)
 Colostygia sericeata (Schwingenschuss, 1926)
 Colostygia stilpna (Prout, 1924)
 Colostygia tempestaria (Herrich-Schäffer, 1852)
 Colostygia turbata (Hübner, 1799)
 Colostygia ustipennis (Hampson, 1895) (from India)
 Colostygia wolfschlaegerae (Pinker, 1953)
 Colostygia zaprjagaevi Viidalepp, 1988

References

Kandasamy, Gunathilagaraj (2016). "Checklist of Indian Geometridae with FBI number". Tamil Nadu Agricultural University.

Cidariini